Tokyo Disneyland is a theme park at the Tokyo Disney Resort in Urayasu, Chiba, Japan. Here are the list of attractions below.

World Bazaar 

 Omnibus
 Penny Arcade

Former Attractions 
 The Disney Gallery
 Main Street Cinema

Adventureland 

 Jungle Cruise
 Pirates of the Caribbean
 Swiss Family Treehouse
 The Enchanted Tiki Room: Stitch Presents Aloha e Komo Mai!
 Western River Railroad

Former Attractions and Entertainment 
 Walt Disney's Enchanted Tiki Room
 The Enchanted Tiki Room: Now Playing "Get the Fever!"
 Adventureland Stage
 Adventureland Revue
 Sebastian's Caribbean Carnival
 Fiesta Tropical
 Mickey & Minnie's Polynesian Paradise
 Theatre Orleans
 Mickey's Adventureland Mardi Gras
 Minnie Oh! Minnie
 Let's Party Gras!
Lilo's Luau & Fun
Mickey's Rainbow Luau

Westernland 

 Big Thunder Mountain
 Country Bear Theater
 Horseshoe Roundup
 Mark Twain Riverboat
 Tom Sawyer Island Rafts 
 The Diamond Horseshoe
 The Diamond Horseshoe presents: Mickey & Company
 Westernland Shootin' Gallery

Former Entertainment 
 Super-Duper Jumpin' Time

Critter Country 

 Beaver Brothers Explorer Canoes
 Splash Mountain

Fantasyland 

 Alice's Tea Party
 Castle Carrousel
 Cinderella Castle
 Cinderella's Fairy Tale Hall
 Dumbo the Flying Elephant
 Enchanted Tale of Beauty and the Beast
 Haunted Mansion
 It's a Small World
 Mickey's PhilharMagic
 Peter Pan's Flight
 Pinocchio's Daring Journey
 Pooh's Hunny Hunt
 Snow White's Adventures
 Snow White Grotto
 Fantasyland Forest Theatre

Former Attractions and Entertainment 
 Cinderella Castle Mystery Tour
 Mickey Mouse Revue
 Skyway
 Small World Stage
 The Kids of the Kingdom
 Let's Be Friends
 It's a Musical World
 Mickey Mouse Club
 Alice's Wonderland Tales

Toontown 

 Chip 'n Dale's Treehouse
 Donald's Boat
 Gadget's Go Coaster
 Goofy's Paint 'n' Playhouse 
 Mickey's House and Meet Mickey
 Minnie's House
 Minnie's Style Studio
 Roger Rabbit's Car Toon Spin
 Toon Park

Former Attractions
 Jolly Trolley
 Goofy's Bounce House

Tomorrowland 

 Buzz Lightyear's Astro Blasters
 Space Mountain
 Star Tours–The Adventures Continue
 Stitch Encounter
 Monsters, Inc. Ride & Go Seek
 The Happy Ride With Baymax

Former Attractions and Entertainment 
 American Journeys
 Captain EO
 Eternal Sea
 Grand Circuit Raceway
 Magic Carpet ‘Round the World
 Magic Journeys
 Meet The World
 MicroAdventure!
 Skyway
 Starcade
 Star Tours
 Star Jets
 Visionarium
 One Man's Dream II: The Magic Lives On

Parades
 Tokyo Disneyland Electrical Parade: Dreamlights
 Nightfall Glow
 Dreaming Up! (ending April 9, 2023)
 Disney Harmony in Color (2023 - onwards)

Former Entertainment
 Disney's Dreams on Parade
 Disney's Dreams on Parade - Moving On
 Jubilation!
 Happiness is Here

Fireworks
 Light the Night

Former Entertainment 
 Brand New Dream
 Happiness on High
Celebrate! Tokyo Disneyland
 Disney Magic in the Sky
 Fantasy in the Sky
 Magic in the Sky
 Millennium Symphony in the Sky
 New Century in the Sky
 Once Upon a Time
 Sky High Wishes
 Starlight Fantasy
 Starlight Magic
 Starlight Magic 2000

References

Tokyo Disneyland

Disneyland